Mike Wilks is the name of:

 Mike Wilks (basketball) (born 1979), NBA basketball player
 Mike Wilks (author), author of The Ultimate Alphabet and Mirrorscape

See also
Michael Wilk (born 1952), American musician
Michael Wilkes (1940–2013), former Adjutant-General to the Forces in the United Kingdom
Michael Wilks (born 1973), Australian lawn bowler